Moses Montrose Pallen (1810 – September 24, 1876) was an American physician, obstetrician, educator and writer.

Life and career
Born in King and Queen County, Virginia in 1810, the son of Solomon Pahlen, a Russian emigrant, he was educated at the University of Virginia, Charlottesville and graduated from the University of Maryland, Baltimore's School of Medicine in 1835. Thereafter, he settled in Vicksburg, Mississippi, where he began his medical practice. After seven years, in 1842, he relocated to St. Louis, Missouri, where he was named professor (later Chair) of obstetrics and the diseases of women at the St. Louis Medical College, where he founded and served as president of the St. Louis Academy of Science, and for several years was president/curator of the St. Louis Medical Society. During the Mexican–American War, Pallen occupied the position of contracting surgeon at the United States Arsenal at St. Louis, and a little later he was health officer of the city during the cholera epidemic of 1849.

Family
Pallen married Janet Cochran (1814–1884), a daughter of William G. Cochran (died 1815), a Baltimore merchant who had been one of Fort McHenry's defenders during the War of 1812, and his wife, Susanna M. Cochran (née McCannon; died 1850), on April 6, 1835 in Baltimore County, Maryland. Moses and Janet Pallen had six children.

Death
He died on September 24, 1876 in St. Louis, Missouri.  The cause of death was recorded as atony of the bowels.  His body was interred in Bellefontaine Cemetery, St. Louis, Missouri.

Sources
 The Encyclopedic History of St. Louis
 Transactions of the Academy of Science of Saint Louis, vol. 23

References

External links
 

1810 births
1876 deaths
American obstetricians
American military doctors
American people of Russian descent
People from King and Queen County, Virginia
Writers from St. Louis
People from Vicksburg, Mississippi
University of Virginia School of Medicine alumni
University of Maryland, Baltimore alumni
Date of birth unknown
Educators from Missouri
19th-century American educators